Sir Frederick Rowland, 1st Baronet (25 December 1874 – 13 November 1959) was Lord Mayor of London for 1949 to 1950.

See also
Rowland baronets

References

Knights Bachelor
1874 births
1959 deaths
20th-century lord mayors of London
Baronets in the Baronetage of the United Kingdom
Sheriffs of the City of London